

Events

January–March 
 January 1 – New York City annexes land from surrounding counties, creating the City of Greater New York as the world's second largest. The city is geographically divided into five boroughs: Manhattan, Brooklyn, Queens, The Bronx and Staten Island.
 January 13 – Novelist Émile Zola's open letter to the President of the French Republic on the Dreyfus affair, J'Accuse…!, is published on the front page of the Paris daily newspaper L'Aurore, accusing the government of wrongfully imprisoning Alfred Dreyfus and of antisemitism.
 February 12 – The automobile belonging to Henry Lindfield of Brighton rolls out of control down a hill in Purley, London, England, and hits a tree; thus he becomes the world's first fatality from an automobile accident on a public highway.
 February 15 – Spanish–American War: The USS Maine explodes and sinks in Havana Harbor, Cuba, for reasons never fully established, killing 266 men. The event precipitates the United States' declaration of war on Spain, two months later.

 February 23 – Émile Zola is imprisoned in France, after writing J'Accuse…!.
 March 1 – Vladimir Lenin creates the Russian Social Democratic Labour Party.
 March 14 – Association football and sports club BSC Young Boys is established in Bern, Switzerland, as the Fussballclub Young Boys.
 March 16 – In Melbourne the representatives of five colonies adopt a constitution, which will become the basis of the Commonwealth of Australia.
 March 24 – Robert Allison of Port Carbon, Pennsylvania, becomes the first person to buy an American-built automobile, when he buys a Winton automobile that has been advertised in Scientific American.
 March 26 – The Sabie Game Reserve in South Africa is created, as the first officially designated game reserve.

April–June 
 April 5 – Annie Oakley promotes the service of women in combat situations, with the United States military. On this day, she writes a letter to President McKinley "offering the government the services of a company of 50 'lady sharpshooters' who would provide their own arms and ammunition should war break out with Spain." In the history of women in the military, there are records of female U.S. Revolutionary and Civil War soldiers who enlisted using male pseudonyms, but Oakley's letter represents possibly the earliest political move towards women's rights for combat service, in the United States military.
 April 22 – Spanish–American War: The United States Navy begins a blockade of Cuban ports and the USS Nashville captures a Spanish merchant ship.
 April 23 – Spanish–American War: A conference of senior Spanish Navy officers led by naval minister Segismundo Bermejo decide to send Admiral Pascual Cervera's squadron to Cuba and Puerto Rico.
 April 25 – Spanish–American War: The United States declares war on Spain; the U.S. Congress announces that a state of war has existed since April 21 (later backdating this one more day to April 20).
 April 25 – In Essen, German company Rheinisch-Westfälisches Elektrizitätswerk RWE is founded.
 April 26 – An explosion in Santa Cruz, California, kills 13 workers, at the California Powder Works.
 April 29 – The Paris Auto Show, the first large-scale commercial vehicle exhibition show, is held in Tuileries Garden.
 May 1 – Spanish–American War – Battle of Manila Bay: Commodore Dewey destroys the Spanish squadron, in the first battle of the war, as well as the first battle in the Philippines Campaign.
 May 2 – Thousands of Chinese scholars and Beijing citizens seeking reforms protest in front of the capital control yuan.
 May 7–9 – Bava Beccaris massacre: Hundreds of demonstrators are killed, when General Fiorenzo Bava Beccaris orders troops to fire on a rally in Milan, Italy.
 May 8 – The first games of the Italian Football Federation are played, in which Genoa played against Torino.
 May 12 – Spanish–American War: The Puerto Rican Campaign begins, with the Bombardment of San Juan.
 May 27 – The territory of Kwang-Chou-Wan is leased by China to France, according to the Treaty of 12 April 1892, as the Territoire de Kouang-Tchéou-Wan, forming part of French Indochina.
 May 28 – Secondo Pia takes the first photographs of the Shroud of Turin and discovers that the image on the Shroud itself appears to be a photographic negative.

 June 1 – The Trans-Mississippi Exposition World's Fair opens, in Omaha, Nebraska.
 June 7 – William Ramsay and Morris Travers discover neon at their laboratory at University College London, after extracting it from liquid nitrogen.
 June 9 – The British government arranges a 99-year rent of Hong Kong from China.
 June 10 – Tuone Udaina, the last known speaker of the Dalmatian language, is killed in an explosion.
 June 11 – Peking Normal University Hall, as predecessor for Peking University was founded in Qing Dynasty. (present day of People's Republic of China) 
 June 12 – Philippine Declaration of Independence: After more than 377 years of Spanish dominance, General Emilio Aguinaldo declares the Philippines' independence from Spain.
 June 13 – Yukon Territory is formed in Canada, with Dawson chosen as its capital.
 June 19 – Food processing giant Nabisco is founded in New Jersey.
 June 21 – Spanish–American War: The United States captures Guam, making it the first U.S. overseas territory.
 June 28 – Effective date of the Curtis Act of 1898 which will lead to the dissolution of tribal and communal lands in Indian Territory and ultimately the creation of the State of Oklahoma in 1907.

July–September 
 July 1 – Spanish–American War: Battle of San Juan Hill – United States troops (including Buffalo Soldiers and Theodore Roosevelt's Rough Riders) take a strategic position close to Santiago de Cuba from the Spanish.
 July 3
 Spanish–American War: Battle of Santiago de Cuba – The United States Navy destroys the Spanish Navy's Caribbean Squadron.
 American adventurer Joshua Slocum completes a 3-year solo circumnavigation of the world.
 July 4 – En route from New York to Le Havre, the ocean liner  collides with another ship and sinks off the coast of Sable Island with the loss of 549 lives.
 July 7 – The United States annexes the Hawaiian Islands.
 July 9 – The Nationale Tentoonstelling van Vrouwenarbeid 1898 took place in The Hague and becomes a milestone for the Dutch women's movement.
 July 17 – Spanish–American War: Battle of Santiago Bay – Troops under United States General William R. Shafter take the city of Santiago de Cuba from the Spanish.
 July 18 – "The Adventures of Louis de Rougemont" first appear in The Wide World Magazine, as its August 1898 issue goes on sale.
 July 25 – Spanish–American War: The United States invasion of Puerto Rico begins, with a landing at Guánica Bay.
 August 12 – Spanish–American War: Hostilities end between American and Spanish forces in Cuba.
 August 13 – Spanish–American War: Battle of Manila – By prior agreement, the Spanish commander surrenders the city of Manila to the United States, in order to keep it out of the hands of Filipino rebels, ending hostilities in the Philippines.
 August 20 – The Gornergrat railway opens, connecting Zermatt to the Gornergrat in Switzerland.
 August 21 – Clube de Regatas Vasco da Gama is founded in Rio de Janeiro.
 August 23 – The Southern Cross Expedition, the first British venture of the Heroic Age of Antarctic Exploration, sets sail from London.
 August 24 – Chickasaw and Choctaw tribes sign the Atoka Agreement, a requirement of the Curtis Act of 1898.
 August 25 – 700 Greeks and 15 Englishmen are slaughtered by the Turks in Heraklion, Greece, leading to the establishment of the autonomous Cretan State.
 August 28 – American pharmacist Caleb Bradham names his soft drink Pepsi-Cola.
 September 2 – Battle of Omdurman: British and Egyptian troops led by Horatio Kitchener defeat Sudanese tribesmen led by Khalifa Abdullah al-Taashi, thus establishing British dominance in the Sudan.
 September 10 – Italian anarchist Luigi Lucheni assassinates Empress Elisabeth of Austria in Geneva, as an act of propaganda of the deed.
 September 18 – Fashoda Incident: A powerful flotilla of British gunboats arrives at the French-occupied fort of Fashoda on the White Nile, leading to a diplomatic stalemate, until French troops are ordered to withdraw on November 3.
 September 21
 Empress Dowager Cixi of China engineers a coup d'état, marking the end of the Hundred Days' Reform; the Guangxu Emperor is arrested.
 Geert Adriaans Boomgaard of Groningen in the Netherlands becomes the world's first validated supercentenarian.

October–December
 October 1 – The Vienna University of Economics and Business is founded, under the name K.U.K. Exportakademie.
 October 3 – Battle of Sugar Point: Ojibwe tribesmen defeat U.S. government troops, in northern Minnesota.
 October 3–8 – The Stuttgart Congress of the Social Democratic Party of Germany is held in Stuttgart.
 October 6 – The Sinfonia Club, later to become the Phi Mu Alpha Sinfonia fraternity, is founded at the New England Conservatory of Music in Boston by Ossian Everett Mills.
 October 12 – The first town council is established in Mateur, Tunisia.

 October 15 – The Fork Union Military Academy is founded, in Fork Union, Virginia.
 October 31 – The Lutheran Church of the Redeemer, Jerusalem, is dedicated.
 November 5 – Negros Revolution: Filipinos on the island of Negros revolt against Spanish rule and establish the short-lived Republic of Negros.
 November 10 – The Wilmington insurrection of 1898, a coup d'état by the white Democratic Party of North Carolina, begins.
 November 26 – A two-day blizzard known as the Portland Gale piles snow in Boston, severely impacting the Massachusetts fishing industry and several coastal New England towns.
 December 9 – The first of the two Tsavo Man-Eaters is shot by John Henry Patterson; the second is killed 3 weeks later, after 135 railway construction workers have been killed by the lions.
 December 10 – The Treaty of Paris is signed, ending the Spanish–American War.
 December 18 – Gaston de Chasseloup-Laubat sets the first official land speed record in an automobile, averaging 63.15 km/h (39.24 mph) over 1 km (0.62 mi) in France.
 December 26 – Marie and Pierre Curie announce the discovery of an element that they name radium.
 December 29 (December 17 Old Style) – The Moscow Art Theatre production of The Seagull by Anton Chekhov opens.
 December 31 – French serial killer Joseph Vacher is executed at Bourg-en-Bresse.

Unknown dates 
 North Petherton becomes the first community in England to install acetylene lighting.
 Wakita is founded in the Cherokee Strip, Oklahoma.
 Henry Adams Consulting Engineers founded by Henry Adams (mechanical engineer) in Baltimore, Maryland (the firm will still be in business in the 21st century).
 The first volume of the Linguistic Survey Of India is published in Calcutta.
 As a result of the merger of several small oil companies, John D. Rockefeller's Standard Oil Company controls 84% of the USA's oil, and most American pipelines.
 JG Palmer is established as a newspaper wholesaler in Kent.

Births

January–March 

 January 1
 Tony DeMarco, American dancer (d. 1965)
 Binay Ranjan Sen, Indian diplomat, 4th Director General of the Food and Agriculture Organization (FAO) (d. 1993)
 January 3 – John Loder, British actor (d. 1988)
 January 7 – Art Baker, American actor (d. 1966)
 January 9 – Gracie Fields, British singer, actress and comedian (d. 1979)
 January 13 – 
 Kaj Munk, Danish playwright, Lutheran pastor and martyr (d. 1944)
 Samsa, Indian playwright, poet and novelist (d.1939)
 January 16
 Margaret Booth, American film editor (d. 2002)
 Irving Rapper, English-born American director (d. 1999)
 January 18 – Margaret Irving, American actress (d. 1988)
 January 20
 John George, Ottoman-born American actor (d. 1968)
 Tudor Owen, Welsh-American actor (d. 1979)
 Norma Varden, British-born American actress (d. 1989)
 January 21
 Rudolph Maté, Polish-born American cinematographer, film director (d. 1964)
 Shah Ahmad Shah Qajar of Persia (d. 1930)
 January 22
 Sergei Eisenstein, Russian and Soviet film director (d. 1948)
Elazar Shach, Lithuanian-born Israeli Haredi rabbi (d. 2001)
 January 23
 Randolph Scott, American film actor (d. 1987)
 January 24 – Karl Hermann Frank, German Nazi official, war criminal (d. 1946)
 January 25 – Hymie Weiss, American gangster (d. 1926)
 January 26 – Katarzyna Kobro, Polish sculptor (d. 1951)
 February 1 – Leila Denmark, American pediatrician, supercentenarian (d. 2012)
 February 2 – William "Billy" Costello, American voice actor, the original voice of Popeye (d. 1971)
 February 3 – Alvar Aalto, Finnish architect (d. 1976)
 February 5
 Sidney Fields, American actor (d. 1975)
 Denjirō Ōkōchi, Japanese actor (d. 1962)
 February 10 
 Bertolt Brecht, German writer (d. 1956)
 Robert Keith, American actor (d. 1966)
 Joseph Kessel, French journalist, author (d. 1979)
 February 11
 Henry de La Falaise, French film director, Croix de guerre recipient (d. 1972)
 Leó Szilárd, Hungarian-American physicist (d. 1964)
 February 12
 Wallace Ford, British actor (d. 1966)
 Roy Harris, American composer (d. 1979)
 Audrey Jeffers, Trinidadian social worker, politician (d. 1968)
 Blue Washington, American actor, Negro league baseball player (d. 1970)
 February 14
Eva Novak, American actress (d. 1988)
 Raúl Scalabrini Ortiz, Argentine writer, journalist, essayist and poet (d. 1959)
 Fritz Zwicky, Swiss physicist, astronomer (d. 1974)
 February 15
 Bud Geary, American actor (d. 1946)
 Totò, Italian comedian, actor, poet, and songwriter (d. 1967)
 Allen Woodring, American runner (d. 1982)
 February 18
 Enzo Ferrari, Italian race car driver, automobile manufacturer (d. 1988)
 Luis Muñoz Marín, Puerto Rican poet, journalist and politician (d. 1980)
 February 20 – Semyon Davidovich Kirlian, Russian inventor (d. 1978)
 February 25 – William Astbury, English physicist, molecular biologist (d. 1961) 
 February 24 – Kurt Tank, German aeronautical engineer (d. 1983)
 February 27 – Otto Hulett, American actor (d. 1983)
 February 28
Hugh O'Flaherty, Irish Catholic priest (d. 1963)
Molly Picon, American actress, lyricist (d. 1992)
 March 3 – Emil Artin, Austrian mathematician (d. 1962)
 March 4 – Georges Dumézil, French philologist (d. 1986)
 March 5 
 Misao Okawa, Japanese supercentenarian (d. 2015)
 Zhou Enlai, Premier of the People's Republic of China (d. 1976)
 Soong Mei-ling, First Lady of China (d. 2003)
 March 6 – Therese Giehse, German actress (d. 1975)
 March 8 – Eben Dönges, acting Prime Minister of South Africa and elected President of South Africa (d. 1968)
 March 10 – Cy Kendall, American actor (d. 1953)
 March 11 – Dorothy Gish, American actress (d. 1968)
 March 13 – Henry Hathaway, American film director, producer (d. 1985)
 March 14 – Arnold Chikobava, Georgian linguist (d. 1985)
 March 15 – Gardner Dow, American college football player (d. 1919)
 March 21 – Paul Alfred Weiss, Austrian biologist (d. 1989)
 March 23 
 Erich Bey, German admiral (d. 1943)
 Madeleine de Bourbon-Busset, Duchess of Parma (d. 1984)
 March 25 – Marcelle Narbonne, French supercentenarian, oldest European living person (d. 2012)
 March 30 – Joyce Carey, English actress (d. 1993)
 March 31 – Hermann van Pels, German-Dutch father of Peter van Pels, housemate of Anne Frank (d. 1944)

April–June 

 April 1 – William James Sidis, American mathematician (d. 1944)
 April 2 – Harindranath Chattopadhyay, Indian poet, actor and politician (d. 1990)
 April 3 – George Jessel, American comedian (d. 1981)
 April 4 – Agnes Ayres, American actress (d. 1940)
 April 6 – Jeanne Hébuterne, French painter (d. 1920)
 April 9 – Paul Robeson, African-American actor, singer and political activist (d. 1976)
 April 12 – Lily Pons, French-American opera singer, actress (d. 1976)
 April 14 – Lee Tracy, American actor (d. 1968)
 April 15 – Marian Driscoll Jordan, American actress (d. 1961)
 April 19 – Constance Talmadge, American actress (d. 1973)
 April 20 – Sidney Lanfield, American film director (d. 1972)
 April 21 – Walter Forde, British actor, screenwriter and film director (d. 1984)
 April 23 – Ernest Laszlo, Hungarian-American cinematographer (d. 1984)
 April 26
 Vicente Aleixandre, Spanish writer, Nobel Prize laureate (d. 1984)
 John Grierson, Scottish documentary filmmaker (d. 1972)
 Tomu Uchida, Japanese film director (d. 1970)
 May 2 – Henry Hall, British bandleader (d. 1989)
 May 3
 Golda Meir, Prime Minister of Israel (d. 1978)
 Septima Poinsette Clark, American educator and civil rights activist (d. 1987)
 May 5
 Elsie Eaves, American civil engineer (d. 1983)
 Blind Willie McTell, American singer (d. 1959)
 Hans Heinrich von Twardowski, German actor (d. 1958)
 May 6 – Konrad Henlein, Sudeten German Nazi leader (d. 1945)
 May 13
 Hisamuddin of Selangor, King of Malaysia (d. 1960)
 Justin Tuveri, Italian World War I veteran (d. 2007)
 May 14 
 Hastings Banda, 1st President of Malawi (d. 1997)
 Betty Farrington, American actress (d. 1989)
 May 15 – Arletty, French model, actress (d. 1992)
 May 16
 Tamara de Lempicka, Polish Art Deco painter (d. 1980)
 Kenji Mizoguchi, Japanese film director (d. 1956)
 May 17
 Anagarika Govinda, German buddhist lama (d. 1985)
 Alfred Joseph Casson, Canadian painter (d. 1992)
 May 19 – Julius Evola, Italian philosopher (d. 1974)
 May 21 – Armand Hammer, American entrepreneur, art collector (d. 1990)
 May 23
 Frank McHugh, American actor (d. 1981)
 Scott O'Dell, American author (d. 1989)
 May 24 – Helen B. Taussig, American cardiologist (d. 1986)
 May 25 – Bennett Cerf, American publisher (d. 1971)
 May 27 – Lee Garmes, American cinematographer (d. 1978)
 May 31
 Ernest Haller, American cinematographer (d. 1974)
 Dr. Norman Vincent Peale, American clergyman (d. 1993)
 June 3 – Stuart H. Ingersoll, American admiral (d. 1983)
 June 4 – Harry Crosby, American publisher, poet (d. 1929)
 June 5
 Federico García Lorca, Spanish poet, playwright (d. 1936)
 Guy La Chambre, French politician (d. 1975)
 June 6
 Walter Abel, American actor (d. 1987)
 Ninette de Valois, Irish dancer, founder of The Royal Ballet, London (d. 2001)
 Jim Fouché, 5th President of South Africa (d. 1980)
 June 10
 Michel Hollard, French Resistance hero (d. 1993)
 Virginia Valli, American film actress (d. 1968)
 June 11 – Lionel Penrose, English geneticist (d. 1972)
 June 12 – Charley Foy, American actor (d. 1984)
 June 17
 M. C. Escher, Dutch artist (d. 1972)
 Harry Patch, British World War I soldier, the last Tommy (d. 2009)
 June 18
 Carleton Hobbs, English actor who played Sherlock Holmes for two decades (d. 1978)
 Dink Trout, American actor (d. 1950)
 June 22 
 Weeratunge Edward Perera, Malaysian educator, businessman and social entrepreneur (d. 1982)
 Erich Maria Remarque, German writer (d. 1970)
 June 23 – Lillian Hall-Davis, English actress (d. 1933)
 June 25 – Buddy Roosevelt, American actor, stunt performer (d. 1973)
 June 26
 Sa`id Al-Mufti, 3-time prime minister of Jordan (d. 1989)
 Willy Messerschmitt, German aircraft designer, manufacturer (d. 1978)
 June 28 – Louis King, American film director (d. 1962)
 June 30 
 George Chandler, American actor (d. 1985)
 Alfredo Duhalde, Chilean politician (d. 1985)

July–September 

 July 1 – Charles Hartmann, American jazz trombonist (d. 1982)
 July 2
 George J. Folsey, American cinematographer (d. 1988)
 Anthony McAuliffe, American general (d. 1975)
 July 3
 Donald Healey, English motor engineer, race car driver (d. 1988)
 Stefanos Stefanopoulos, Prime Minister of Greece (d. 1982)
 July 4
 Gertrude Weaver, American supercentenarian, last surviving person born in 1898 (d. 2015)
 Gulzarilal Nanda, Indian politician, economist (d. 1998)
 Gertrude Lawrence, English actress, singer (d. 1952)
 Johnny Lee, American singer, dancer, and actor (d. 1965)
 July 5 – Richard P. Condie, American conductor of the Mormon Tabernacle Choir (d. 1985)
 July 6 
 Bill Amos, American college football player, coach (d. 1987)
 Hanns Eisler, German composer (d. 1962)
 July 7 
 Maria Nunes da Silva, Portuguese supercentenarian (d. 2011)
 Teresa Hsu Chih, Chinese-born Singaporean social worker, supercentenarian (d. 2011)
 Arnold Horween, American Harvard Crimson, NFL football player (d. 1985)
 Hugh Llewellyn Keenleyside, Canadian university professor, diplomat, and civil servant (d. 1992)
 July 9 
 Gerard Walschap, Belgian writer (d. 1989)
 Al Bedner, American football player (d. 1988)
 July 10 – Theodore Miller Edison, American businessman, inventor, and environmentalist (d. 1992)
 July 13 – Ivan Triesault, Estonian-born American actor (d. 1980)
 July 14
 David Horne, English actor (d. 1970)
 John Twist, American screenwriter (d. 1976)
 Happy Chandler, American politician (d. 1991)
 Youssef Wahbi, Egyptian actor, film director (d. 1982)
 July 15 
 Howard Graham, Canadian Army Officer (d. 1986)
 Erik Wilén, Finnish sprinter (d. 1982)
 July 17
 Osmond Borradaile, Canadian cameraman, cinematographer and veteran of the First and Second World Wars (d. 1999)
 Berenice Abbott, American photographer (d. 1991)
 George Robert Vincent, American sound recording pioneer (d. 1985)
 Benito Díaz, Spanish football manager, player (d. 1990)
 July 18 – John Stuart, Scottish actor (d. 1979)
 July 19 – Gustavo Machado Morales, Venezuelan politician and journalist (d. 1983)
 July 21 – Sara Carter, American country music singer, musician, and songwriter (d. 1979)
 July 22
 Stephen Vincent Benét, American writer (d. 1943)
 Alexander Calder, American artist (d. 1976)
 July 23 – Walter L. Morgan, American banker (d. 1998)
 July 25 – Arthur Lubin, American film director (d. 1995)
 July 28 – Lawrence Gray, American actor (d. 1970)
 July 29 – Isidor Isaac Rabi, American physicist, Nobel Prize laureate (d. 1988)
 July 30 – Henry Moore, English sculptor (d. 1986)
 July 31 – Ken Harris, American animator (d. 1982)
 August 2 – Glenn Tryon, American actor, screenwriter, and film director (d. 1970)
 August 5
Lewis R. Foster, American film director, screenwriter (d. 1974)
Kumbakonam Rajamanickam Pillai, Indian Tamil Carnatic music violinist (d. 1970)
 August 11 – Peter Mohr Dam, 2-time prime minister of the Faroe Islands (d. 1968)
 August 12
 Kenneth Hawks, American film director (d. 1930)
 Maria Klenova, Russian marine geologist (d. 1976)
 Oskar Homolka, Austrian actor (d. 1978)
 August 13 
 Mohamad Noah Omar, Malaysian politician (d. 1991)
 Regis Toomey, American actor (d. 1991)
 August 15 – Jan Brzechwa, Polish poet (d. 1966)
 August 17 – Dewey Robinson, American actor (d. 1950)
 August 18
 Lance Sharkey, Australian Communist Leader (d. 1967)
 Tsola Dragoycheva, Bulgarian politician (d. 1993)
 August 19 – Eleanor Boardman, American actress (d. 1991)
 August 20
 Leopold Infeld, Polish physicist (d. 1968)
 Vilhelm Moberg, Swedish novelist, historian (d. 1973)
 August 21 – Herbert Mundin, English actor (d. 1939)
 August 23 – W. E. Butler, British occultist (d. 1978)
 August 25 – Van Nest Polglase, American art director, design department head at RKO Pictures (d. 1968)
 August 26 – Peggy Guggenheim, American art collector (d. 1979)
 August 27 – John Hamilton, Canadian criminal, bank robber (d. 1934)
 August 29 – Preston Sturges, American director, writer (d. 1959)
 August 30 – Shirley Booth, American actress (d. 1992)
 September 1
 Violet Carson, British actress (d. 1983) 
 Marilyn Miller, American actress, singer, and dancer (d. 1936)
 September 2
 Alfons Gorbach, 15th Chancellor of Austria (d. 1972)
 Arthur Young, English actor (d. 1959)
 September 8 – Queenie Smith, American actress (d. 1978)
 September 10
 George Eldredge, American actor (d. 1977)
 Bessie Love, American actress (d. 1986)
 September 13
 Roger Désormière, French conductor (d. 1963)
 Emilio Núñez Portuondo, Cuban diplomat, lawyer and politician, 13th Prime Minister of Cuba (d. 1978)
 September 16 – Baruch Lumet, Polish-born American actor (d. 1992)
 September 19 – Giuseppe Saragat, President of Italy (d. 1988)
 September 22 – Katharine Alexander, American actress (d. 1981)
 September 24 – Howard Florey, Australian-born pharmacologist, recipient of the Nobel Prize in Physiology or Medicine (d. 1968)
 September 25 – Robert Brackman, American artist (d. 1980)
 September 26 – George Gershwin, American composer (d. 1937)
 September 29 – Trofim Lysenko, Russian biologist (d. 1976)
 September 30
 Renée Adorée, French actress (d. 1933)
 Princess Charlotte of Monaco (d. 1977)

October–December 

 October 3 – Morgan Farley, American actor (d. 1988)
 October 6
 Arthur G. Jones-Williams, British aviator (d. 1929)
 Mitchell Leisen, American film director (d. 1972)
 Clarence Williams, American jazz pianist, composer (d. 1965) 
 October 7 – Joe Giard, American baseball player (d. 1956)
 October 10
 Lilly Daché, French milliner (d. 1989)
 Marie-Pierre Kœnig, French general, politician (d. 1970)
 October 15 – Boughera El Ouafi, Algerian athlete (d. 1959)
 October 16 – William O. Douglas, Associate Justice of the Supreme Court of the United States (d. 1980)
 October 17 – Shinichi Suzuki, Japanese musician, educator (d. 1998)
 October 18
 George Curzon, English actor (d. 1976)
 Lotte Lenya, Austrian actress, singer (d. 1981)
 October 20 – Sergi Jikia, Georgian historian and orientalist (d. 1993)
 October 22 – Dámaso Alonso, Spanish poet (d. 1990)
 October 24 – Peng Dehuai, Chinese military leader (d. 1974)
 October 28 – Abdul Khalek Hassouna, Egyptian diplomat, 2nd Secretary-General of the Arab League (d. 1992)
 November 1 – Philip Ray, British actor (d. 1978)
 November 4 – Joe Dougherty, first voice of Porky Pig (d. 1978)
 November 11 – René Clair, French filmmaker, novelist, and non-fiction writer (d. 1981)
 November 12 – Leon Štukelj, Slovene gymnast (d. 1999)
 November 14 – Benjamin Fondane (née Wechsler), Romanian-French Symbolist poet, critic and existentialist philosopher (d. 1944)
 November 17
 Colleen Clifford, Australian actress (d. 1996)
 Maurice Journeau, French composer (d. 1999)
 November 18
 Joris Ivens, Dutch director (d. 1989)
 Andrés Soler, Mexican actor (d. 1969)
 November 19 – Arthur R. von Hippel, German-born physicist (d. 2003)
 November 21 – René Magritte, Belgian artist (d. 1967)
 November 22 – Gabriel González Videla, Chilean politician (d. 1980)
 November 23 – Bess Flowers, American actress (d. 1984)
 November 24 – Liu Shaoqi, President of the People's Republic of China (d. 1969)
 November 25 – Debaki Bose, Indian actor, director and writer (d. 1971)
 November 26 – Karl Ziegler, German chemist, Nobel Prize laureate (d. 1973)
 November 29
 Rod La Rocque, American actor (d. 1969)
 C. S. Lewis, British author (d. 1963)
 November 30 – Firpo Marberry, American baseball pitcher (d. 1976)
 December 2 – Indra Lal Roy, Indian World War I pilot (d. 1918)
 December 3 – Monte Collins, American actor and screenwriter (d. 1951)
 December 5 – Grace Moore, American opera singer, actress (d. 1947)
 December 6
 Alfred Eisenstaedt, American photojournalist (d. 1995)
 Gunnar Myrdal, Swedish sociologist, economist and Nobel Prize laureate (d. 1987)
 December 9
 Emmett Kelly, American circus clown (d. 1979)
 Clarine Seymour, American actress (d. 1920)
 December 11
 Benno Mengele, Austrian electrical engineer (d. 1971)
 Taro Shoji, Japanese singer (d. 1972)
 December 14 – Lillian Randolph, American actress, singer (d. 1980)
 December 19 – Zheng Zhenduo, Chinese author, translator (d. 1958)
 December 20 – Irene Dunne, American actress (d. 1990)
 December 24 – Baby Dodds, American jazz drummer (d. 1959)
 December 27 
 Hilda Vaughn, American actress (d. 1957)
 Inejiro Asanuma, Japanese politician (d. 1960)
 December 28 – Shigematsu Sakaibara, Japanese admiral and war criminal (d. 1947)
 December 29 – Randi Anda, Norwegian politician (d. 1999)
 December 30
Umm Kulthum, Egyptian singer and actress (d. 1975)
Claire Huchet Bishop, author of The Five Chinese Brothers (with illustrator Kurt Wiese) and The Man Who Lost His Head (with illustrator Robert McCloskey) (d. 1993)
 December 31 – István Dobi, Hungarian leader (d. 1968)

Date unknown 
 I. K. Taimni, Indian chemist (d. 1978)
 William Wardsworth, Liberian politician (d. 1977)

Deaths

January–June 

 January 3 – Lawrence Sullivan Ross, Confederate brigadier general, Texas governor, and president of Texas A&M University (b. 1838)
 January 14 – Lewis Carroll, British writer, mathematician (Alice in Wonderland) (b. 1832)
 January 16 – Charles Pelham Villiers, longest-serving MP in the British House of Commons (b. 1802)
 January 18 – Henry Liddell, English Dean of Christ Church, Oxford (b. 1811)
 January 26 – Cornelia J. M. Jordan, American lyricist (b. 1830)
 February 1 – Tsuboi Kōzō, Japanese admiral (b. 1843)
 February 6 – Abdul Samad of Selangor, Malaysian ruler, 4th Sultan of Selangor (b. 1804)
 February 16 – Thomas Bracken, author of the official national anthem of New Zealand (God Defend New Zealand) (b. 1843)
 March 1 – George Bruce Malleson, Indian officer, author (b. 1825)
 March 6 – Andrei Alexandrovich Popov, Russian admiral (b. 1821)
 March 10
 Marie-Eugénie de Jésus, French religious (b. 1817)
 George Müller, Prussian evangelist, founder of the Ashley Down orphanage (b. 1805)
 March 11 – William Rosecrans, California congressman, Register of the U.S. Treasury (b. 1819)
 March 15 – Sir Henry Bessemer, British engineer, inventor (b. 1813)
 March 16 – Aubrey Beardsley, British artist (b. 1872)
 March 18 – Matilda Joslyn Gage, American feminist (b. 1826)
 March 27 – Sir Syed Ahmad Khan, Indian university founder (b. 1817)
 March 28 – Anton Seidl, Hungarian conductor (b. 1850)
 April 13 – Aurilla Furber, American author (b. 1847)
 April 15 – Te Keepa Te Rangihiwinui, Maori military leader
 April 18 – Gustave Moreau, French painter (b. 1826)
 April 29 – Mary Towne Burt, American benefactor (b. 1842)
 May 19 – William Ewart Gladstone, Prime Minister of the United Kingdom (b. 1809)
 May 22 – Edward Bellamy, American author (b. 1850)
 May 29 – Theodor Eimer, German zoologist (b. 1843)
 June 4 – Rosalie Olivecrona, Swedish feminist activist (b. 1823)
 June 10 – Tuone Udaina, Croatian-Italian last speaker of the Dalmatian language (b. 1821)
 June 14 – Dewitt Clinton Senter, American politician, 18th Governor of Tennessee (b. 1830)
 June 25 – Ferdinand Cohn, German biologist, bacteriologist and microbiologist (b. 1828)

July–December 

 July 1
Siegfried Marcus, Austrian automobile pioneer (b. 1831)
Joaquín Vara de Rey y Rubio, Spanish general (killed in action) (b. 1841)
 July 5 – Richard Pankhurst, English lawyer, radical and supporter of women's rights (b. 1834)
 July 8 – Soapy Smith, American con artist and gangster (b. 1860)
 July 14 – Louis-François Richer Laflèche, Roman Catholic Bishop of Trois-Rivières, Native American missionary (b. 1818)
 July 30 – Otto von Bismarck, German statesman (b. 1815)
 August 8 – Eugène Boudin, French painter (b. 1824)
 August 11 – Sophia Braeunlich, American business manager (b. 1854)
 September 2 – Wilford Woodruff, fourth president of the Church of Jesus Christ of Latter-day Saints (b. 1807)
 September 5 – Sarah Emma Edmonds, Canadian nurse, spy (b. 1841)
 September 9 – Stéphane Mallarmé, French poet (b. 1842)
 September 10 – Empress Elisabeth of Austria, empress consort of Austria, queen consort of Hungary (assassinated) (b. 1837)
 September 16 – Ramón Emeterio Betances, Puerto Rican politician, medical doctor and diplomat (b. 1827)
 September 19 – Sir George Grey, 11th Premier of New Zealand (b. 1812)
 September 20 – Theodor Fontane, German writer (b. 1819)
 September 26 – Fanny Davenport, American actress (b. 1850)
 September 28 – Tan Sitong, Chinese revolutionary (executed) (b. 1865)
 September 29 – Louise of Hesse-Kassel, German princess, queen consort of Christian IX of Denmark (b. 1817)
 October 24 – Pierre Puvis de Chavannes, French painter (b. 1824)
 November 2 – George Goyder, surveyor-general of South Australia (b. 1826)
 November 20 – Sir John Fowler, British civil engineer (b. 1817)
 December 24 – Charbel Makhluf, Lebanese Maronite, Roman Catholic and Eastern Catholic monk, priest and saint (b. 1828)
 December 25 – Laura Gundersen, Norwegian actress (b. 1832)

Date unknown
 Sotirios Sotiropoulos, Greek economist, politician (b. 1831)

References

Sources

  Morro Castle (fortress) downloadable videos. ( needs Flash)
  view of USS Indiana (BB-1) (needs Flash)
  (needs Flash)
  view of 10th U.S. Infantry, 2nd Battalion (needs Flash)
  view of Tampa, Florida (needs Flash)
  view of Tampa, Florida (needs Flash)
  (needs Flash)
  (needs Flash)
  (needs Flash)
  view of Daiquirí after the United States invasion of Cuba in the Spanish–American War (needs Flash)
  view of Major General Shafter (needs Flash)
  view of Santiago (needs Flash)